The 1984 All-Ireland Junior Hurling Championship was the 54th staging of the All-Ireland Junior Championship since its establishment by the Gaelic Athletic Association in 1912.

Kerry entered the championship as the defending champions, however, they were beaten by Cork in the Munster final.

The All-Ireland final was played on 9 September 1984 at the Roger Casement Park in Coventry, between Cork and Warwickshire, in what was their third ever meeting in the final and a first in 29 years. Cork won the match by 3–20 to 0–07 to claim their sixth championship title overall and a first tile in 12 years.

Results

All-Ireland Junior Football Championship

All-Ireland semi-finals

All-Ireland home final

All-Ireland final

References

Junior
All-Ireland Junior Football Championship